Ronald Leavitt (November 7, 1947 – February 10, 2008) was an American television writer and producer. He was the co-creator (with Michael G. Moye) of the American television show Married... with Children.  The show's 259 episodes over 11 seasons made it the second-longest lasting sitcom on the Fox network.

Life and career
Raised in a Jewish family in Brooklyn, Leavitt began his television career in the 1970s writing episodes for the comedies Busting Loose, Happy Days, Laverne & Shirley, and The Bad News Bears (for which he garnered an NAACP award).  In the early 1980s, in addition to writing and producing The Jeffersons (for which he won a People's Choice Award and a second NAACP award), Leavitt co-wrote the pilot for Silver Spoons and co-created and executive produced the Jason Bateman sitcom It's Your Move.

In the late 1980s, Leavitt co-created Married... with Children, which, with its debut on the Fox network in 1987, broke many of the established rules and mores of television.  He served as executive producer and wrote or co-wrote close to 150 episodes.  Its longevity over 11 seasons made Married... with Children the second-longest running sitcom on Fox, just behind The Simpsons.  Among its industry honors, Married... with Children earned seven Emmy nominations and an equal number of Golden Globe nominations, including Best TV Series.

The show became a springboard for Leavitt to create a number of spin-offs, initially Top of the Heap, starring Matt LeBlanc and Joseph Bologna, and Vinnie & Bobby, starring Matt LeBlanc and Robert Torti.  He subsequently co-created, executive produced, and wrote Unhappily Ever After. In more recent years, Leavitt created and wrote several episodes of the WB's The Help.

Other achievements outside television include recognition by the State of California as Citizen Hero of the Year in 2001, and the equally notable accomplishment of out-eating wrestler King Kong Bundy in a cheesesteak sandwich-eating contest at Dominick's Kitchen while Bundy was guest-starring on Married... with Children.

He had two children, Matt and Samantha. He also had a long-time partner, Jessica Hahn. He died on February 10, 2008, from lung cancer.

Filmography
Busting Loose (1977)
Happy Days (1978)
Brothers and Sisters (1979)
Makin' It (1979)
The Bad News Bears (1979)
Laverne & Shirley (1979)
Silver Spoons (1982)
The Jeffersons (1980-1984)
It's Your Move (1984-1985) (Co-Creator, with Michael G. Moye)
Married... with Children (1987-1997) (Co-Creator, with Michael G. Moye)
Top of the Heap (1991) (Co-Creator, with Arthur Silver)
Vinnie & Bobby (1992) (Co-Creator, with Arthur Silver)
Unhappily Ever After (1995) (Co-Creator, with Arthur Silver)
The Help (2004)

References

 Obituary of Ron Leavitt from the San Jose Mercury News

External links
 

1947 births
2008 deaths
20th-century American Jews
Deaths from lung cancer in California
American television writers
American male television writers
People from Brooklyn
Screenwriters from New York (state)
20th-century American screenwriters
20th-century American male writers
21st-century American Jews